A folk healer is an unlicensed person who practices the art of healing using traditional practices, herbal remedies and the power of suggestion.

Depending on the culture, the healer may have received some type of training or even inherited some "gift" of healing from their parents.

Granny women
Granny women are purported to be healers and midwives in Southern Appalachia and the Ozarks, claimed by a few academics as practicing from the 1880s to the 1930s. They are theorized to be usually elder women in the community and may have been the only practitioners of health care in the poor rural areas of Southern Appalachia. They are often thought not to have expected or received payment, and were respected as authorities on herbal healing and childbirth.  They are mentioned by John C. Campbell in The Southern Highlander and His Homeland:

Alleged cancer healing 
Folk medicine in Appalachia has historically included nontraditional methods of treating skin cancer. In the early 1900s, for example, a Virginian man named Thomas Rauleigh Carter became renowned for his prowess in healing skin cancer in addition to his midwifery. Although he was a minister, his treatments focused on the application or ingestion of specific herbs and plants rather than on faith in a higher power. Carter kept his formula secret, even from his immediate family, and treated many people for lesions and skin conditions believed to be cancerous.

See also
 Cunning folk
 White witch
 Folk medicine 
 Faith healing
 Home remedy
 Alternative medicine
 Kitchen witch
 Witcher (mythology)
 Curandero
 Traditional healers of Southern Africa
 Medicine man
 Witch doctor

References

Sources
 Keith Thomas, Religion and the Decline of Magic (1971), p. 534.
Ryan Stark, Rhetoric, Science, and Magic in Seventeenth-Century England (2009), 123-27.
Anthony P. Cavender. Folk Medicine in Southern Appalachia (2003).

Medical anthropology
Magic (supernatural)
Society of Appalachia
Midwifery